Ailan (also Romanized as Āilan) is a village in Chaypareh-ye Bala Rural District, Zanjanrud District, Zanjan County, Zanjan Province, Iran. At the 2006 census, its population was 90, in 15 families.

References 

Populated places in Zanjan County